Aggrey Memorial Secondary School is a school in Arochukwu, Nigeria.

History
Founded in 1931, Aggrey Memorial Secondary School is a co-educational secondary school. The school was founded by the Nigerian educator, statesman, activist and politician Dr Alvan Azinna Ikoku.

Unlike many founders who would name institutions after themselves, Dr Ikoku named the institution after James Emman Kwegyir Aggrey (October 18, 1875 – July 30, 1927) who was a missionary and teacher from Ghana.

References

External links 
Official Website

Secondary schools in Abia State
Educational institutions established in 1931
1931 establishments in Nigeria